Acala is a guardian deity primarily revered in Vajrayana Buddhism in Japan, China and elsewhere.

Acala may also refer to:

Acalā, the eighth bhūmi, the eighth of the ten completion stages of the Bodhisattva path in Buddhism
Acala Ch'ol, a former Ch'ol Maya territory of Guatemala
Acala, Texas, a ghost town in Texas, US
Acala, Chiapas, a town in Mexico
Acala Municipality, Mexico

See also
Acalan, a Chontal Maya region in what is now southern Campeche, Mexico